The Military Secretary (MS) is an administrative post in the federal government of Pakistan tasked with appointment, posting and other military administrative privileges given by the government. In Pakistan's political system, a military secretary to the prime minister of Pakistan is held by a military personnel with a rank of brigadier, while military secretary to the president of Pakistan is usually held by a military officer with lieutenant colonel or equivalent rank. Military Secretary is entitled to assist the office with correspondence in staff. Since the office is literary held by an aide-de-camp (ADC), a MS does not execute promotions and appointments of military officers independently.

In the Pakistan Army, a deputy military secretary is appointed to the general headquarters assigned with career management privileges of low ranking officers such as major, captain or equivalent.

List of secretaries

Secretaries to prime minister

Secretaries to president

See also 
Military Secretary to the India Office
Military Secretary (India)
Military Secretary (United Kingdom)

References

Further reading 
 

Pakistan Army
Pakistani military appointments
Government of Pakistan